"Sundress" is a song by American rapper ASAP Rocky, released as a single on November 20, 2018. It was co-produced by Danger Mouse, and samples the 2010 Tame Impala song "Why Won't You Make Up Your Mind?" Its music video was released the same day.

Composition
"Sundress" is an upbeat pop song with elements of disco and rock that samples the psychedelic pop track "Why Won't You Make Up Your Mind?" by Australian band Tame Impala, from their 2010 album Innerspeaker. ASAP Rocky "swings easily between a sing-song croon and swift bars about nursing old feelings after a break-up" on the track, which was said to take the "original's fervently pulsing chillout session [...] up a few notches until it's a party track".

Music video
The music video was directed by Frank Lebon and features artist and model Kesewa Aboah. In the video, Aboah is walking down a street with her partner and notices a man walking across the street who mysteriously turns in Rocky. She and her partner then follow Rocky into a club where she shoots him in the head, thus creating an explosion of shared memories of the two together. In the end, time reverses and she returns to her partner, who is revealed to be Rocky. The music video was called "trippy" by Billboard, "enthralling" by Rolling Stone, and "surreal" by Oyster. It was compared to the Mannequin Challenge by Uproxx. Colin Hodgson, in an analysis, compared it to the 1962 French short film La Jetée, which features still image photography.

Critical reception
Along with the reception for the video, critics also commented on the song, with The Fader calling it "vibrantly-produced", noting ASAP Rocky's switch from singing to rapping. Callum Russell of Redbrick described it as a “bizarre, experimental melting pot of genre” praising Rocky’s verses but ultimately found the song “falls just short of the mark”. Clayton Shaw of Rebel Rebel Music called it an “ethereal masterpiece”, writing “Sundress is Rocky at his creative best, blending and combining various genres to craft a song that breaks down boundaries whilst managing to be catchy and inventive.”

Charts

Certifications

References

2018 singles
2018 songs
ASAP Rocky songs
Songs written by ASAP Rocky
Songs written by Danger Mouse (musician)